Taurolema superba is a species of beetle in the family Cerambycidae. It was described by Ernst Fuchs in 1966. It is known from Peru.

References

Mauesiini
Beetles described in 1966